The IBM ThinkPad X40 is a laptop from the ThinkPad line that was manufactured by IBM, announced in October 5, 2004.

Reception 

CNET rated the X40 as "very good" with an 8.5 out of 10.

References

External links 

 IBM.com - IBM ThinkPad X40

IBM laptops
ThinkPad